Victoria Azarenka was the defending champion but decided not to participate.
Venus Williams won the title, defeating Monica Niculescu 6–2 6–3.

Seeds

Main draw

Finals

Top half

Bottom half

Qualifying

Seeds

Qualifiers

Lucky loser

  Anne Keothavong

Draw

First qualifier

Second qualifier

Third qualifier

Fourth qualifier

External links
 WTA tournament draws

BGL Luxembourg Open - Singles
2012 Singles
2012 in Luxembourgian tennis